Garden of Shadows, a novel by V. C. Andrews, was first published in 1987. V. C. Andrews died in 1986, and her estate commissioned ghostwriter Andrew Neiderman to continue writing novels under her name developed from plot outlines originally written by Andrews. There is some dispute over whether this particular novel was written in part by Andrews before she died, or whether it was written entirely by Neiderman. This is the fifth novel of the Dollanganger series. The novel explains the origin of Olivia Winfield (the grandmother in Flowers in the Attic), the events that cause her to become the cold, domineering mistress of Foxworth Hall, and Corinne's childhood and eventual betrayal. It is the fifth novel of the Flowers in the Attic series but considered the prequel, as the story told takes place prior to the events of the first book. The story covers the years between 1918 and 1957.

Plot

Part I
Tall, plain Olivia Winfield is rescued from spinsterhood by the smart and handsome Malcolm Foxworth. She thinks she has found "the one" since he is the first man to ever show interest in her. Malcolm, taken by her forthright manner and impressed with her intelligence, proposes after only two days' acquaintance. They marry two weeks later. Olivia leaves her family home in New London, Connecticut, to move to his family's mansion, Foxworth Hall, in Charlottesville, Virginia. Olivia starts to discover dark secrets about Malcolm, which eventually diminish her love for him. At a party to celebrate their wedding, Malcolm talks to and flirts with other women, neglecting Olivia.

She discovers that Malcolm is still tormented by his mother Corinne's abandonment of him at age five. She believes her own plain looks and money attracted him to her, since he mistrusts conventionally beautiful women. While he is attracted to beauty and seems likely to consider an affair, it is obvious he lacks enough patience and true feeling for such an entanglement. Olivia feels betrayed and humiliated but is still optimistic that things will change as they begin their life together.

When exploring the house, she discovers the "Swan Room" which belonged to Malcolm's mother. It has been kept as a shrine to her and contains a very large, ornate bed carved in the shape of a swan. When Malcolm discovers her in the room, they finally consummate their marriage, an act that could be considered more of an attack than an act of love,  with Malcolm saying his mother's name the entire time. Olivia wants to scream but does not, trying to hide her humiliation from the servants.

Nine months later, Olivia gives birth to a boy, Malcolm Jr., referred to as "Mal." Malcolm is kind to her at times, giving her hope that things might improve between them.  But for the most part, Olivia feels unimportant and ignored.  Two years later, she gives birth to a second son, Joel.  Malcolm is upset, as Joel is not healthy and he wanted their second child to be a girl. They are also told she cannot have any more children. Malcolm does not fully appreciate his sons because of his disappointment at not having a daughter.

Part II
Shortly after Joel is born, Malcolm's father Garland comes back to Foxworth Hall with his new wife, Alicia. Olivia is disgusted that Alicia is only nineteen and very beautiful. Malcolm is enraged to discover that she is pregnant, thinking that her child will inherit part of Garland's fortune. Alicia makes numerous friendly overtures to Olivia, but Olivia keeps distant from her.  Alicia gives birth to a son, whom she names Christopher.

However, Malcolm becomes obsessed with Alicia. When Alicia spurns his advances, Malcolm is convinced that she is leading him on and vows to make her pay dearly. Olivia witnesses Malcolm's lust. Humiliated and heartbroken, she blames Alicia for making herself attractive to Malcolm.

On the night of Christopher's third birthday, Garland catches Malcolm trying to rape Alicia, gets into a violent argument with him, has a heart attack, and dies. Amidst the somber air in the manor, Malcolm seems to be feeling some guilt and avoids Alicia. Eventually, though, his obsession resumes.  Soon Alicia confesses to Olivia that Malcolm has been coming to her bedroom and raping her, threatening to throw her and her son out on the street penniless if she does not yield. She has become pregnant with Malcolm's child. Olivia is humiliated and jealous.

Olivia decides that the only thing to do is to hide Alicia away while Olivia herself feigns being with child. Once Alicia secretly delivers, Olivia will pass the baby off as hers; Malcolm will give Alicia Garland's inheritance, and she and Christopher will leave. Alicia reluctantly agrees, says goodbye to Christopher, and goes into hiding in the attic of Foxworth Hall. Olivia hires new servants as an extra precaution to safeguard their secret, but she fears that Malcolm's interest in Alicia remains. To make Alicia less attractive to him, Olivia coerces her into cutting off her long hair, which Olivia leaves on Malcolm's desk to show that she is now the one in control.

As months pass, Olivia begins to think of Christopher as another son and is heartbroken when Alicia suddenly and quietly leaves with him after the birth of a daughter. However, Olivia is soon enraged when she discovers that Malcolm has named his new child Corinne (her name is spelled "Corrine" in the V.C. Andrews-penned original novels), after his mother, and plans to oversee her upbringing. He acts like an only parent to the young Corinne, often overriding attempts by Olivia to raise her to be a proper young woman.  Olivia still does what she can to be a mother to Corinne, and takes joy in their relationship.

In the years that pass, Corinne grows up into a happy but spoiled girl and Malcolm continues to be emotionally distant from his sons and wife. He often criticizes the boys to Olivia and is upset that Joel exhibits little interest in his business, though Mal seems to be willing to follow in his father's footsteps.  Mal dies in a motorcycling accident when he rides off a cliff near Foxworth Hall. Later John Amos, Olivia's cousin, is hired as butler and he incorporates religion into the household. Joel soon leaves on a tour of Europe with a professional orchestra—against his father's wishes—and receives fame in several European newspapers. Olivia is proud of Joel, but Malcolm dismisses Joel's path as frivolous and an embarrassment to the family. Beneath the criticism is worry for his son and disappointment in his choice to leave Foxworth Hall.

Part III
Joel's parents are informed of his death by avalanche in a telegram which also reveals that his body was not recovered. Devastated over the loss of their sons, Olivia and Malcolm turn to religion and bond somewhat, until Olivia receives a letter from Alicia, who is dying from breast cancer.
Alicia remarried soon after leaving Foxworth Hall, but her husband died a few years later. She and Christopher have been living in poverty since becoming bankrupt during the Great Depression. Remembering Olivia's kindness to Christopher while she was in the attic, Alicia pleads with her to give Christopher a home and put him through medical school. Olivia convinces Malcolm to agree to this, so Christopher comes to live with them.

When they meet for the first time, Corinne and Christopher fall deeply in love. It goes unnoticed by the household, however, because they all adore Christopher. Later John Amos begins to suspect incest, although Olivia brushes it off as his jealousy.  She and Malcolm seem truly happy and content with their family for the first time.  Although she expresses herself subtly, Olivia is drawn to Christopher.

After Christopher graduates from college and Corinne has finished high school, a letter of acceptance arrives from Harvard. Olivia is excitedly searching to tell Christopher when John Amos reports that Christopher and Corinne are making love in the Swan Room.  She does not believe him, but a quick peek shows it is true. Olivia is heartbroken and tells Malcolm. Christopher and Corinne try to explain themselves, but Malcolm condemns them and Olivia sides with him instead of intervening. They are banished and disinherited.

Malcolm has a stroke followed by a heart attack, and he is forced to use a wheelchair. Olivia devotes herself to his care.  Olivia reveals to John Amos that Christopher was not just Corinne's half-uncle, but also her half-brother. She tells of the sins and the events that led to them. John preys on Olivia's fear of God, urging her and Malcolm to become obsessively religious.

Malcolm is a changed man after the scandal. Finally he breaks, and asks Olivia to hire a private detective to find out what happened to Corinne. The P.I. returns and informs Olivia that they live in Gladstone, Pennsylvania (outside of Philadelphia) under the name of Dollanganger. Christopher has dropped out of medical school and works in public relations, while Corinne is a housewife. They live a typical suburban, middle-class life. The two have four children: Chris, Cathy, and twins Cory and Carrie.  All four children are perfectly healthy, bright, and beautiful, known in their town as the Dresden Dolls. Olivia does not tell Malcolm about the children because she believes that he will want to see his grandchildren and become bewitched by their beauty, especially the girls'.

Years later, Corinne writes to tell of Christopher's death in a car accident and to seek shelter. Olivia is heartbroken over Christopher's death, but John Amos tells her that it was God's work. He also convinces her to allow Corinne and the children to come. But the children must be hidden from the world forever, if she wants to end the sins within Foxworth Hall. Olivia tells Malcolm that Corinne is coming home, still not mentioning the children's existence.

When she first sees them, Chris and Cathy remind Olivia so much of Christopher and Corinne. But she refuses to love them; as products of incest, they are "the devil's spawn". The book ends with Olivia silently vowing to keep her heart hardened against the children and to keep them forever hidden from the world—while feeling just as imprisoned as they will soon be.

Clarifications
This book, though a prequel, actually changes the entire scandalous nature of the series. As well as being half-uncle and niece, it is revealed Chris and Corinne were three-quarter brother and sister as they shared the same mother but their fathers were father and son, making them more closely related than half siblings but less than full siblings. The book also gives a sympathetic side to Olivia previously unseen in the other books.  However, Olivia's softer side was implied in Flowers in the Attic, when Cathy theorizes at one point, though briefly, that Olivia was trying to prevent them from eating the poisoned donuts their mother sets out for them, when Olivia agrees with Cathy's demands that the dying twin Cory be taken to a hospital (but he really wasn't), when Olivia gives them a plant, and when Christopher witnesses Olivia in prayer at the foot of her bed.

This book also clarifies the suspicious marriage of Corinne and John Amos (mentioned in If There Be Thorns), considering the latter's obvious disgust with incest. As Corinne is not Olivia's biological daughter, she and John Amos are not genetically related.

Also, this book examines Corinne's betrayal. It has stated in this book that she wanted to marry and have children, but her greedy side is shown in the other books, such as in If There Be Thorns, when Christopher states that Corinne wanted him to sue and get the money that was his. Her betrayal is likely due to the fact that she was spoiled by her father and grew up in wealth, so once the children were in the attic, she turned her attention toward getting her inheritance. Corinne conspired with Olivia to lock her children away and said (about waking the twins so they could walk, as Chris and Cathy were complaining about their arms aching from holding them), "Lord knows, they'd better walk outside while they can." Corinne claims in Petals On the Wind that she did put arsenic on the doughnuts, but her plan was not to kill them—it was to get the children sick one by one and take them out of the attic "to the hospital," then come back and tell Olivia that they had died. However, this claim seems doubtful, as Corinne and her husband Bart moved out of Foxworth Hall after Cory died, and she did not seem concerned with helping the remaining three children escape.

Errors/inconsistencies
 In the previous Dollanganger books, Cathy and Chris's mother's name is spelled "Corrine". However, in Garden of Shadows, it is spelled "Corinne". Garden of Shadows was written by ghostwriter Andrew Neiderman.
 In Flowers in the Attic, Corrine and her four children arrive at Foxworth Hall in the month of June to August, yet in this book, light snow is falling when they arrive.
 There is a slight confusion as to when the children arrived at Foxworth Hall. Cathy mentions that they had been in the attic for 3 years, 4 months, and 16 days (POTW- p 18). They left on 10 Nov 1960 meaning they arrived about 24 June 1957. Yet in Flowers in the Attic chapters "Goodbye Daddy" to "Roads to Riches", the dad dies in early May and it is implied that a few months passed before they abandoned the house in Gladstone. Also on page 231, it's mentioned that "August had come and gone. We have been in this prison a full year." 
 The dollhouse that belongs to Olivia stays at her old house. There is no mention of it ever arriving at Foxworth Hall, as it does in Flowers in the Attic.
 In Flowers in the Attic, Christopher Sr. dies at age 36; in Garden of Shadows, he dies at age 35. (This may be because it was his birthday.)
 In Flowers in the Attic, Corrine tells her children that Olivia was abused by her mother (she was locked in a closet, causing Olivia's claustrophobia and unwillingness to go into the attic), while in "Shadows" Olivia recounts a warm and loving relationship with a gentle mother, and goes into the attic several times, especially once when she has Alicia captive in there. "Shadows" does mention that Olivia's mother locked her in the closet as punishment when she misbehaved.
 In Garden of Shadows, Malcolm Jr. dies at Foxworth Hall in a motorcycle accident; in Flowers in the Attic, Corrine tells her children that he died at a cabin he had built. Differences lie in the location of death and who was present.
 In Flowers in the Attic, Corrine tells her children that Joel ran away from home and sent a single postcard, while in Garden of Shadows, Olivia mentions many newspaper clippings were sent home. Corrine recalls Joel saying goodbye to his parents, while she was not present in Garden of Shadows.  
 In Garden of Shadows, Olivia mentions her loving relationship with Corrine, while in Flowers in the Attic, Olivia proudly states that she thought Corrine to be trash from birth (although it is possible that she is lying or just disgusted by what Corrine did).
 In Flowers in the Attic Olivia screams at Cathy and Chris that their parents eloped secretly and came back to ask forgiveness for falling in love. However, in Garden of Shadows, Olivia catches Christopher Sr. and Corrine making love.  This leads to a confrontation with Malcolm and Olivia, after which Christopher and Corrine willingly flee Foxworth Hall.
 In Flowers in the Attic Corrine tells Cathy that she was 12, and out bike riding when she got her first period, while in Garden Of Shadows Corrine is 14 and proudly shares the news with her mother.
 Garden of Shadows does not mention Olivia's ever-present diamond brooch, nor any close friends that make her gray dresses (Flowers in the Attic). In fact, Garden of Shadows says that Olivia had no friends in Virginia, finding the women too weak, frivolous, and nasty for her liking.
 In Flowers in the Attic, when confronted by Cathy, Corrine reveals that Malcolm wrote on a letter to her, in reply for her pleas for help after Chris Sr. dies, that the only thing good about their (Chris Sr. and Corrine's) marriage was the fact it didn't create any devil's issue (inbred children). In Garden of Shadows, Olivia says that she writes the letter, and Malcolm does not write anything on it. Also, Olivia does not let Malcolm know about the children, knowing that Malcolm would be bewitched by their beauty, especially the girls, and would not punish the children for the evil that their parents have done. (It is likely that Corrine may have been lying to keep her children under control and conspired with Olivia to keep Malcolm unaware of their existence.)
 Olivia's son Malcolm Jr. is nicknamed "Mal" to differentiate him from his father. The earlier books in the series stated that he was known as "Mel."
 Garden of Shadows shows that John Amos meets Corrine for the first time when she is 14, while it is mentioned in If There be Thorns that she was 10.
 In Garden of Shadows, Christopher is named Christopher Garland Foxworth. In Flowers in the Attic, his name is Garland Christopher Foxworth the Fourth.
 In Flowers in the Attic, Corrine tells the children that her parents had forced her and her brothers to attend church every Sunday no matter what. In Garden of Shadows, there is no mention of the family ever attending church.
 In Flowers in the Attic, Corrine tells the children that she and her brothers were forbidden from being exposed to each other, which includes swimming together because her mother said it was a sin and was abused if they disobeyed. In Garden of Shadows, Olivia does not mind it and even lets Corrine swim with Christopher. There is no mention of Corrine being abused but the boys are disciplined by their father who whips them and verbally abuses them.
 In Flowers in the Attic, Olivia expresses hatred towards her grandchildren because of their incestuous conception, even physically and emotionally abusing them. In Garden of Shadows, she feels drawn to them and actually wanted to love them, but decided against it because of what their parents had done. She may be keeping this in mind in her treatment of the children in the first novel.
 In Flowers in the Attic and in previous novels, Corrine maintains that she was abused by her father. But in Garden of Shadows, Corrine was doted on and spoiled by her father. She may have reconsidered his treatment in retrospect.
 In Flowers in the Attic, Corrine writes several letters to her parents asking for help. In Garden of Shadows, Olivia responds back to Corrine after the first letter arrives.

Characters introduced

Alicia Foxworth: Garland's second wife, stepmother to Malcolm, and mother of Christopher and Corinne. When first introduced, she was nineteen and pregnant. Malcolm believes she is with his father only because of his money but Alicia is truly in love with Garland.  She is later raped by Malcolm and Olivia locked her in the same attic the Dollanganger children were locked in while she was pregnant with Corinne. She later dies of breast cancer.
Garland Foxworth: Father of Malcolm and Christopher, the paternal grandfather of Corinne, and husband of Alicia. He is a kind and likable man but somewhat dismissive towards problem child Malcolm while giving more attention to perfect child Christopher. He dies of a heart attack on Christopher's third birthday, after fighting with his son Malcolm over Alicia.
Malcolm "Mal" Neal Foxworth, Jr.: Older brother of Joel, nephew of Christopher, and paternal half-brother of Corinne. He was usually referred to as "Mal" so he could be told apart from his father. He dies in a motorcycling accident. He was mentioned by Corinne in Flowers in the Attic.
Joel Joseph Foxworth: Younger brother of Mal.  He is treated with disdain by his father, who considers him a "sissy."  Joel is a talented musician and later joins an orchestra. Joel is presumed dead in an avalanche and his body was never found.  A man claiming he is Joel Foxworth appears in Seeds of Yesterday  but he behaves like John Amos Jackson. (He may have been a fraud and the cousin that John predicted in If There Be Thorns would stand behind him).

Adaptation
Lifetime adapted the novel as Flowers in the Attic: The Origin as a four-part miniseries. It premiered on July 9, 2022. and concluded on July 30, 2022. Starring Jemima Rooper as Olivia and Max Irons as Malcolm.  Supporting cast includes Kelsey Grammer, Harry Hamlin, Kate Mulgrew, Paul Wesley, T’Shan Williams, Hannah Dodd, and Alana Boden.

References
Notes

Books by V. C. Andrews

Prequel novels
1987 American novels
Novels by V. C. Andrews
American young adult novels
Novels published posthumously
Novels set in Virginia
Charlottesville, Virginia
First-person narrative novels